Hristo Batandzhiev (Gyumendzhe, Ottoman Empire, present day Goumenissa,  Greece – 1913, Aegean Sea) was a Bulgarian revolutionary, one of the founders of "The Committee for Obtaining the Political Rights Given to Macedonia by the Congress of Berlin" from which, later developed the IMRO known prior to 1902 as Bulgarian Macedonian-Adrianople Revolutionary Committees (BMARC). 

He was a teacher in the Bulgarian Exarchate school in Thessaloniki and Secretary of the Bulgarian Bishopric in the city between 1888 and 1911. Batandzhiev also participated in the Ilinden-Preobrazhenie Uprising. After the Young Turk Revolution from 1908, he was an active member of the Bulgarian Constitutional Clubs Party.

In July 1913, after the outbreak of the Second Balkan War, Hristo Batandzhiev was arrested by the Greek authorities. He was about to be deported to the island of Trikeri in the Aegean Sea, together with many other Bulgarians. During the trip however, he was killed by the Greeks.

References

Sources
 Encyclopedia "Bulgaria", vol. 1, Publishing House of the Bulgarian Academy of Sciences, Sofia, 1978 (in Bulgarian): Енциклопедия България, том 1, Издателство на БАН, София, 1978).

1913 deaths
Bulgarians from Aegean Macedonia
Members of the Internal Macedonian Revolutionary Organization
Bulgarian revolutionaries
Bulgarian educators
Macedonian Bulgarians
People who died at sea
20th-century executions by Greece
Bulgarian people imprisoned abroad
Prisoners who died in Greek detention
Bulgarian people of the Balkan Wars
Balkan Wars casualties
People executed by military occupation forces
Deaths in the Aegean Sea
People from Goumenissa
1869 births